Pattikkaattu Raja is a 1975 Indian Tamil-language film, starring Sivakumar, Jayasudha in the  title role.  Kamal Haasan, Fatafat Jayalaxmi, Sripriya and Thengai Srinivasan plays a supporting role. Pandari Bai plays a guest appearance. The film was released on 12 July 1975.

Plot 
Annasamy (Sivakumar) is an uneducated villager who wants to marry his cousin Sarasu (Fatafat Jayalaxmi). She's a college student in the city and his uncle insists on Sarasu's approval before going ahead with the wedding. Annasamy heads to the city to find her and befriends Usha (Jayasudha) in the process. Together they find Sarasu who secretly married club singer Mahesh (Kamal Haasan) and has been abandoned by him. Annasamy is determined to get them reunited but learns that Mahesh is now in love with Meenu (Sripriya). They also learn that Sarasu has a heart ailment that will require expensive surgery and her illness is the reason Mahesh left her. In a bid to earn this money, Annasamy agrees to work for the police by posing as the wanted criminal Raja (Sivakumar) as the two look exactly alike. Tiger (S. A. Ashokan) is the head of a large criminal organization and is looking for an expensive and rare jewel encrusted crown. Raja and Meenu both work for him though both have questionable allegiances. There are several different factions operating to gain the crown and many spies within each. In the midst of this, Raja realizes he's being impersonated and convinces everyone he is the real Annasamy. As the characters try to get their hands on the crown, more confusions rise.

Cast 
 Sivakumar as Annasamy / Raja
 Jayasudha as Usha
 Kamal Haasan as Mahesh
 Fatafat Jayalaxmi as Sarasu
 Sripriya as Meenu
 Thengai Srinivasan as Meganathan
 Manorama as Alamelu
 S. N. Lakshmi as Thangam
 S. A. Ashokan as Tiger
 Pandari Bai as Maria (Guest Appearance)
 T. K. Bagavathy

Soundtrack 
The music was composed by Shankar–Ganesh.

References

External links 
 

1970s Tamil-language films
1975 films
Films scored by Shankar–Ganesh